Barbara Kentner (August 21, 1982 – July 4, 2017) was an Indigenous woman from Wabigoon Lake First Nation who died in 2017, six months after being struck by a trailer hitch thrown at her by Brayden Bushby from a moving vehicle in Thunder Bay, Ontario, Canada.

Bushy was found guilty of manslaughter and sentenced to eight years in jail.

Family life 
Kentner was born on August 21, 1982, in Dryden, Ontario, the eldest of four sisters to truck driver father Roy Boucher and mother Mildred (née Maude) Kentner. She grew up in Thunder Bay and had four half-siblings. Kentner was Anishinaabe and from Wabigoon Lake First Nation. She had had two sisters and a daughter, Serena Jane Kentner, who was 16 years old in January 2017. Her daughter had acute myeloid leukaemia and had a bone marrow transplant in 2020. Kentner's father died of a heart attack in 2002 and her mother died of cancer in 2004.

Kentner lived with liver disease and lived in a palliative care facility.

Events of 29 January 2017 
At approximately 1am on 29 January 2017, 18-year-old Brayden Bushby was in the passenger seat of a vehicle driving on McKenzie Street in the south side area of Thunder Bay. Three other friends were in the vehicle, and Bushby was intoxicated with alcohol, after spending the day drinking straight whisky. Bushby is white.

Kentner, and her three-years-younger sister Melissa, were walking down McKenzie Street towards a relative's home when Bushby threw a metal trailer hitch, which struck Kentner in the abdomen. Bushby exclaimed "got one" after the hitch struck Kentner. Kentner was 34 years old at the time of the attack. The incident ruptured her small intestine.

Death 
Kentner died on July 4, 2017, at St. Joseph’s Hospice in Thunder Bay as she received surgery to tackle an infection from the injury. Kentner's lawyers stated that the infection that was caused by the blunt force trauma of the attack.

Post-death events 
Bushby was initially charged with second-degree murder, but that charge was later downgraded. Bushby admitted to throwing the hitch and pled guilty to aggravated assault, before being found guilty of manslaughter. In February 2021, he was sentenced to eight years in jail.

The attack on Kentner is discussed in the Thunder Bay podcast.

References 

1982 births
2017 deaths
2017 in Ontario
January 2017 crimes in North America
Ojibwe people
People from Dryden, Ontario
People from Thunder Bay